David Ivor St. Hubbins is a fictional character in the mockumentary film This Is Spinal Tap (1984). In the film, he is the lead singer and rhythm guitarist of the mock rock band Spinal Tap. David is played by actor Michael McKean, who improvised the role through the whole film. McKean writes in his introduction to This Is Spinal Tap: The Official Guide, "When I am called upon to generate copy about the mostly fictional entity called Spinal Tap, I usually do so in the mostly fictional character of David St. Hubbins."

St. Hubbins's name was inspired by Derek St. Holmes, who is the lead vocalist and rhythm guitarist for Ted Nugent.

Character biography
St. Hubbins, whose namesake is the "Patron Saint of Quality Footwear", was born August 13, 1947, in Squatney, London, England. He grew up in Squatney in flat #45. Fellow Spinal Tap band member Nigel Tufnel lived next door in flat #47. They did not know each other at first. At age 7 and 8, the new friends Nigel and David began their musical adventure together. David says: "We left school and started playing Tube station skiffle. It was like the filings feel about a magnet. We were the filings, Spinal Tap became the magnet". They have recorded the first song they wrote together in 1955: "(Cry) All the Way Home".

After his first divorce, St. Hubbins was married to his long-time girlfriend, Jeanine Pettibone (June Chadwick). They moved to Pomona, California, where they opened two "boutiquerias".  David credits Jeanine, and her love of astrology, with getting his cosmically challenged life back in order. In an interview with David and Jeanine, David said, "Before I met Jeanine my life was cosmically a shambles. I was using bits and pieces of whatever eastern philosophy would drift through my transom". His relationship with Jeanine caused some turbulence in the band, especially when she became the band's manager toward the end of the tour documented in This Is Spinal Tap. They were divorced in early 2000 and remained on friendly terms. According to the movie, David has a son named Misha. 

The fictional character of David St. Hubbins took part in the non-fictional musical advocacy group Hear 'n Aid.

References

Fictional people from London
Fictional rock musicians
Spinal Tap (band) members
Fictional guitarists
Film characters introduced in 1984
Male characters in film
Comedy film characters